Khaled, released in 1992, is Khaled's self-titled album. The album was produced by Michael Brook and Don Was.

The album was primarily sung in Khaled's native Algerian Arabic dialect with the exception of "Ne m'en voulez pas", which was sung in French.

Production

Khaled signed with French record label Barclay Records, then brought in American record producer Don Was to "incorporate American R&B—to Americanize the music", which Don Was achieved by combining Khaled's live musicians with loops and beats from his Macintosh computer and a keyboard. The result of these sessions in the studio that combined Khaled's rai with Was' R&B, was, according to Was, "pretty wild music."

Reception
The response from the Arab public was mixed. Many of the more conservative Arabs stopped buying his records and going to his concerts, feeling offended by exposure to what they perceived as the liberal West, and by what they saw as "(selling) out to Western commercialism". Others saw this as new, cool, and revolutionary, and he attracted a new audience.

The music from the album, especially "Didi," was played in French nightclubs and on Hip Hip Hourah, and the album began to sell well throughout France. The French emcee Malek Sultan of hip-hop band IAM called Khaled the "Public Enemy Arabe".  Khaled is regarded as the first raï artist to successfully cross over into the French pop market.

Track listing
 "Didi" – 5:02
 "El Arbi" – 3:35
 "Wahrane" – 4:27
 "Ragda" – 3:51
 "El Ghatli" – 4:07
 "Liah Liah" – 4:21
 "Mauvais Sang" – 6:13
 "Braya" – 4:46
 "Ne m'en voulez pas" – 4:57
 "Sbabi" – 4:05
 "Harai" – 3:57

Certifications

References

Khaled (musician) albums
1992 albums
Albums produced by Don Was
Barclay (record label) albums
Wrasse Records albums